Plasmodium mexicanum is a parasite of the genus Plasmodium subgenus Paraplasmodium.

Like all Plasmodium species P. mexicanum has both vertebrate and insect hosts. The vertebrate hosts for this parasite are reptiles.

Taxonomy 
The parasite was first described by Thompson and Huff in 1944.

Distribution 
This parasite is found in Arizona, United States.

Hosts 
This parasite infects the Sceloporus ferraripezi, Sceloporus horridus, Sceloporus microlepidotus, western fence lizard (Sceloporus occidentalis), Sceloporus pyrocephalus, Sceloporus variabilis, Scleroporus torquatus torquatus and the tree lizard (Urosaurus ornatus).

This species is unusual in being able to undergo normal sporogony in psychodid flies (Lutzomyia stewarti and Lutzomyia vexatrix).

References

Further reading 

mexicanum